Have You Seen Drum Recently? is a 1989 film which uses photographs from the Drum archives to tell the story of the magazine and documents its contribution to the cultural and political life of South Africa.

In the 1950s, Drum focused on urban blacks living in a white-dominated apartheid world. It contained articles about the township jazz scene, crime, fiction and sport and documented the hopes, aspirations and despair of the urban, educated black sophisticate.

Directed by Jürgen Schadeberg, the film includes such images as Oliver Tambo as a lawyer, Trevor Huddleston demonstrating against the demolition of Sophiatown, Nelson Mandela sparring in the boxing ring, Chief Luthuli the Nobel Prize winner and the singer Miriam Makeba.

The background music is based on the music of the 1950s, including big band, jazz, swing, kwela and penny whistle.

External links
 

1989 films
1980s English-language films
South African documentary films